Chitishio is a dzong in Tibet. The site is in ruins; it was a Buddhist monastery.

References

Forts in Tibet
Dzongs in Tibet
Tibetan Buddhist monasteries